It's Real is the third full-length recording by American R&B singer-songwriter James Ingram. It was released in May 1989 on Qwest/Warner Bros. Records, and features the smash hit single "I Don't Have the Heart", which peaked at number 1 for 1 week. It also features a remake of the classic song "(You Make Me Feel Like) A Natural Woman", re-written with different lyrics and entitled "(You Make Me Feel Like) A Natural Man".

Critical reception

Robin Katz, reviewer of British music newspaper Music Week, left mainly favourable overlook on this album, saying that "Ingram presents his usual standard of contemporary sophisticated soul." He concluded: "Title track could be a smash and will appeal to Bobby Brown boppers while final cut is weepie in Whitney style."

Track listing

Side one - It's Real Hard
"It's Real" (Kemp Frank, Gene Griffin, Barry Hankerson, Ingram) - 5:13
"I Wanna Come Back" (Marc Gordon, Gerald Levert) - 4:51
"Call On Me" (Ingram, Bernard Taylor) - 4:03
"So Fine" (Ingram, Bernard Taylor) - 4:04
"Love Come Down" (Gene Griffin, Ingram) - 5:40
"Baby Be Mine" (Bell, Ingram) - 5:00

Side two - It's Real Soft
"(You Make Me Feel Like) A Natural Man" (Gerry Goffin, Carole King, Jerry Wexler) - 5:04
"Love One Day At a Time" (Ingram, Monty Seward) - 4:31
"I Don't Have the Heart" (Jud Friedman, Allan Rich) - 4:14
"Someday We'll All Be Free" (Donny Hathaway, Edward Howard) - 4:10
"When Was the Last Time the Music Made You Cry" (Ingram, Dennis Matkosky, Kathy Wakefield) - 4:57

Production 
 Producers – Gene Griffin (Tracks 1 & 5); Gerald Levert and Marc Gordon (Track 2); James Ingram (Tracks 3, 4 & 7-10); Bernard Taylor (Track 3); Michael J. Powell (Track 6); Monty Seward (Track 7); Thom Bell (Tracks 8, 9 & 10); Dennis Matkosky (Track 10).
 Executive Producers – James Ingram and Thom Bell
 Associate Producers – Barry Hankerson and Benny Medina
 Production Coordination – John Tominaga (Track 6); Yolandra Fletcher King (Tracks 7-10).
 Engineers – Dave Way (Tracks 1 & 5); Mike Tarsia (Track 2); Barney Perkins (Tracks 2 & 6); Paul Ericksen (Tracks 3, 4 & 7-10); Winston Johnson (Tracks 3, 4 & 7-10); Steve Van Arden (Track 3); Robert Loftus (Track 4); Dennis Matkosky (Track 10).
 Assistant Engineers – Tony Shimkin (Tracks 1 & 5); Tom Biener, Marty Hozenberg, Fred Kelly Jr., David Radin and Mitch Zelinsley (Tracks 2, 3, 4 & 6-10).
 Additional Engineer on Track 6 – Milton Chan
 Mixing – Barney Perkins (Track 2); Mike Tarsia  (Track 2); Sidney Burton (Tracks 3 & 4); Winston Johnson (Tracks 3, 4, 7, 9 & 10); Paul Ericksen (Tracks 7-10).
 Mastered By Bernie Grundman at Bernie Grundman Mastering (Hollywood, CA).
 Management – Barry Hankerson at The Midwest Group.

Personnel 
 James Ingram – lead vocals (all tracks), backing vocals (1, 4, 5, 7), arrangements (3, 4, 7, 9, 10), keyboards (3, 4, 9), drums (3, 4)
 Winston Johnson – keyboard programming (all tracks), Synclavier programming (all tracks), 
 Dwayne Russell – keyboard programming (all tracks)
 Brian Simpson – keyboard programming (all tracks)
 Frank Stangerup – keyboard programming (all tracks)
 Teddy Riley – all instruments (1, 5), backing vocals (1, 5), arrangements (1, 5), 
 Jim Salamone – keyboard sequencing (2)
 Bernard Taylor – keyboards (3, 4), drums (3, 4), arrangements (3, 4)
 Aaron Zigman – keyboards (3, 4)
 Vernon Fails – keyboards (6), rhythm arrangements (6)
 Robbie Buchanan – synthesizer programming (6)
 Monty Seward – keyboards (7), synthesizers (7), backing vocals (7), arrangements (7)
 Jud Friedman – keyboards (8), programming (8), arrangements (8)
 Dennis Matkosky – keyboards (10), synthesizers (10), arrangements (10)
 Paul Jackson Jr. – guitar (3, 7, 8)
 Abraham Laboriel – bass (6, 10)
 Freddie Washington – bass (7)
 Thom Bell – bass (8), arrangements (8, 9, 10), horn and string arrangements (8, 9, 10), conductor (8, 9, 10)
 Nathan East – bass (9)
 Ricky Lawson – drums (6, 8, 9)
 Jeff Porcaro – drums (7)
 Paulinho da Costa – percussion (7)
 Dan Higgins – saxophone (4) 
 Larry Williams – saxophone (4)
 Gerald Albright – saxophone solo (6)
 Ernie Watts – saxophone (7)
 Gary Grant – trumpet (4)
 Jerry Hey – trumpet (4), horn arrangements (4) 
 Toots Thielemans – harmonica solo (9)
 Marc Gordon – arrangements (2)
 Michael J. Powell – rhythm arrangements (6)
 Sephra Winters – horn and string contractor (8, 9, 10)
 Bernard Belle – backing vocals (1)
 Regina Belle – backing vocals (1)
 Marsha McClurkin – backing vocals (1)
 William Aquart, Jr. – backing vocals (1)
 Gerald Levert – backing vocals (2), arrangements (2)
 Jim Gilstrap – backing vocals (3)
 Phil Perry – backing vocals (3, 4)
 Bobbette Jamerson – backing vocals (6)
 Tim Johnson – backing vocals (6)
 Valerie Pinkston-Mayo – backing vocals (6), BGV arrangements (6)
 Carl Calwell – backing vocals (7)
 Josie James – backing vocals (7)
 Marva King – backing vocals (7)
 Kimaya Seward – backing vocals (7)
 The Aquarian Singers – backing vocals (8, 9)

Additional Credits
 Art Direction – Kim Champange and Jeri McManus
 Design – Andy Engel
 Photography – Aaron Rapoport
 Personal Assistant – Yolandra Fletcher King
 Stylist – Cecille Parker
 Hair and Make-up – Elbert Oliver

Charts

References

1990 albums
Albums produced by Gerald Levert
Albums produced by Thom Bell
James Ingram albums
Qwest Records albums
Warner Records albums
Albums produced by Michael J. Powell